Luigi Freroni (born 27 September 1955) is an Italian ice dancer. He competed in the ice dance event at the 1976 Winter Olympics.

References

1955 births
Living people
Italian male ice dancers
Olympic figure skaters of Italy
Figure skaters at the 1976 Winter Olympics
Place of birth missing (living people)